Anopino is a rural locality (a settlement) and the administrative center of Posyolok Anopino, Gus-Khrustalny District, Vladimir Oblast, Russia. The population was 2,043 as of 2010. There are 17 streets.

Geography 
Anopino is located 23 km north of Gus-Khrustalny (the district's administrative centre) by road. Timenka is the nearest rural locality.

References 

Rural localities in Gus-Khrustalny District
Vladimir Governorate